Albert Hague (born Albert Marcuse, October 13, 1920 – November 12, 2001) was a German–born American songwriter and actor.

Early life
Hague was born to a Jewish family in Berlin, Germany. His father, Harry Marcuse, was a psychiatrist and a musical prodigy, and his mother, Mimi (née Heller), a chess champion. His family considered their Jewish heritage a liability and raised him as a Lutheran (although he would later embrace his Jewish heritage after coming to the United States). Shortly before he was to be inducted into the Hitler Youth, he and his mother fled to Rome. Hague came to America in 1939 after his sister, who lived in Ohio, got him a musical scholarship at the University of Cincinnati. However, as he did not have a legal immigration status to be in the country, he was adopted by an eye surgeon associated with the university. After graduating in 1942, he served in the United States Army's special service band during World War II.

Career
Hague's Broadway musicals include Plain and Fancy (1955), Redhead (1959), Cafe Crown (1964), and The Fig Leaves Are Falling (1969, with lyrics by Allan Sherman).

Famous songs he wrote include "Young and Foolish", "Look Who's in Love" and "Did I Ever Really Live?" He was the composer for the TV musical cartoon How the Grinch Stole Christmas and some songs in the 2000 musical version. He also was an actor, most notably on the TV series Fame, where he played Benjamin Shorofsky, the music teacher. It was a part he originated in the film of the same name. Hague also played a small role in the movie Space Jam (1996), as the psychiatrist that the Professional Basketball players go to when they lose their "skill".

Hague and his wife Renee occasionally presented a cabaret act, first as "Hague and Hague: His Hits and His Mrs." and later, in 1998, under the title "Still Young and Foolish". They played at Carnegie Hall, the Cinegrill in Los Angeles, and Eighty Eight's in Manhattan.

Hague was a member of The Lambs where he often taught musical theater to members.

Personal life and death
His wife, Renee Orin, an actress and singer, with whom he often collaborated, died, aged 73, in August 2000 from lymphoma. They had been married since 1951.  They had two children. Albert Hague died at age 81 from cancer at a hospital in Marina del Rey, California in November 2001.

Filmography

References

External links

1920 births
2001 deaths
American Lutherans
Converts to Lutheranism from Judaism
Deaths from cancer in California
Jewish emigrants from Nazi Germany to the United States
German Lutherans
Jewish American songwriters
Writers from Berlin
People from Greater Los Angeles
United States Army Air Forces soldiers
University of Cincinnati – College-Conservatory of Music alumni
20th-century American male actors
Male actors from Berlin
Musicians from Berlin
United States Army Air Forces personnel of World War II
German male writers
German male songwriters
20th-century American musicians
20th-century German musicians
American musical theatre composers
Broadway composers and lyricists
Tony Award winners
20th-century Lutherans
United States Army Band musicians
20th-century American Jews
Members of The Lambs Club